Keeanu Benton (born July 17, 2001) is an American football defensive tackle for the Wisconsin Badgers.

Early life and high school
Benton grew up in Janesville, Wisconsin and attended Joseph A. Craig High School. As a senior, he made 75 tackles, seven tackles for loss, two sacks, and one fumble recovery. Benton committed to play college football at Wisconsin over an offer from Iowa.

College career
Benton played in 13 games and made six starts at nose tackle as a freshman and finished the season with 12 tackles, four tackles for loss, and two sacks. He played in seven games and made seven starts at nose tackle during his sophomore season. He was named second team All-Big Ten Conference as a junior after making 25 tackles with five tackles for loss, 2.5 sacks, and two forced fumbles.

References

External links

Wisconsin Badgers bio

Living people
American football defensive tackles
Players of American football from Wisconsin
Wisconsin Badgers football players
People from Janesville, Wisconsin
2001 births